The Circle Jerks were an American punk rock band whose most recent lineup consisted of vocalist Keith Morris, guitarist Greg Hetson, bassist Zander Schloss, and drummer Kevin Fitzgerald. The band was formed in Southern California in 1979, and originally comprised Morris on vocals, Hetson on guitar, Roger Rogerson on bass and Lucky Lehrer on drums.

The first Circle Jerks lineup released three albums (including their 1980 debut Group Sex), before Rogerson and Lehrer were kicked out of the band in 1983 and replaced by Earl Liberty and Chuck Biscuits respectively. This lineup lasted only a year, and the Circle Jerks hired Zander Schloss and Keith Clark as Liberty and Biscuits' replacements. The new lineup, consisting of Morris, Hetson, Schloss and Clark, recorded two more albums before the Circle Jerks split up for the first time in 1990, when Hetson left to concentrate on Bad Religion, which he had joined a few years before.

A long period of inactivity ended in 1994, when the Circle Jerks, with the 1984-1990 lineup, reunited and signed a major label deal with Mercury Records, a move that had a few business complications: Hetson was still with Bad Religion, who had signed a long-term contract with Atlantic Records, while Schloss had been part of a band contracted to Interscope. After ironing out these difficulties, the band recorded Oddities, Abnormalities and Curiosities and released it in the summer of 1995, but broke up once again. Reasons for this breakup were essentially the same as they were in 1990.

A second Circle Jerks reunion occurred in 2001. Participating this time were Morris, Hetson, Schloss and Kevin Fitzgerald, who filled in on drums for Clark, who at that time had retired from the music business. Tensions among its members and failed attempts to record the follow-up to Oddities, Abnormalities and Curiosities resulted in the Circle Jerks breaking up yet again in 2011. The band announced in November 2019 that they would reunite in 2020 to celebrate the 40th anniversary of Group Sex with live shows.

Former members
Keith Morris
Active: 1979–2010
Instruments: lead vocals
Release contributions: all Circle Jerks releases

Greg Hetson
Active: 1979–2010
Instruments: lead guitar, backing vocals
Release contributions: all Circle Jerks releases

Roger Rogerson
Active: 1979–1983
Instruments: bass, backing vocals
Release contributions: Group Sex (1980), Wild in the Streets (1982), Golden Shower of Hits (1983)

Lucky Lehrer
Active: 1979–1983
Instruments: drums, percussion
Release contributions: Group Sex (1980), Wild in the Streets (1982), Golden Shower of Hits (1983)

Earl Liberty
Active: 1983–1984
Instruments: bass, backing vocals
Release contributions: Repo Man soundtrack (1984)

Chuck Biscuits
Active: 1983–1984
Instruments: drums, percussion
Release contributions: Repo Man soundtrack (1984)

Zander Schloss
Active: 1984–2010
Instruments: bass, backing vocals
Release contributions: Wonderful (1985), VI (1987), Oddities, Abnormalities and Curiosities (1995)

Keith Clark
Active: 1984–1995
Instruments: drums, percussion, backing vocals
Release contributions: Wonderful (1985), VI (1987), Oddities, Abnormalities and Curiosities (1995)

Kevin Fitzgerald
Active: 2001–2010
Instruments: drums, percussion
Release contributions: I'm Gonna Live - single (2007)

Timeline

References

Circle Jerks